The New Durham Town Hall is located at Main Street and Ridge Road in the center of New Durham, New Hampshire.  Built in 1908, it is the town's second town hall, and an architecturally distinctive design of Dover architect Alvah T. Ramsdell.  It was listed on the National Register of Historic Places in 1980.

Description and history
New Durham's town hall is prominently located in its village center, at the northwest corner of Main Street and Ridge Road.  It is a -story wood-frame structure, with a hip roof and clapboarded exterior.  It is a stylistically distinctive combination of Colonial Revival and Italianate design, with an elaborately decorated hood sheltering the recessed entry.  The northeast corner of the building is taken up by a  tower, which has corner pilasters rising to the third stage, and a hipped roof topped by a weathervane.  The interior houses town offices on the ground floor, and an auditorium and meeting space on the upper level.

The town hall was  built in 1908, replacing in function the town's original 1770 meetinghouse, which still stands in the rural New Durham Corner area to the south.  The new location of the town's civic heart was occasioned by changes in the town's economic focus due to the construction of new roads, and arrival in the 1850s of the railroad.  In addition to serving its civic function, the upstairs hall is also a social center, housing meetings and events of community groups.  Alvah Ramsdell, the architect, was prominent in the region, designing a number of similar town halls, as well as schools and commercial buildings.

See also
National Register of Historic Places listings in Strafford County, New Hampshire

References

City and town halls on the National Register of Historic Places in New Hampshire
Colonial Revival architecture in New Hampshire
Italianate architecture in New Hampshire
Government buildings completed in 1908
Buildings and structures in Strafford County, New Hampshire
City and town halls in New Hampshire
Clock towers in New Hampshire
National Register of Historic Places in Strafford County, New Hampshire
New Durham, New Hampshire
1908 establishments in New Hampshire